Thyago Fernandes de Araújo (born 5 December 1985 in Brasília), better known as Thyago Fernandes, is a Brazilian footballer.

Contract
 Ceará.

External links
Thyago Fernandes at playmakerstats.com (English version of ogol.com.br)

1985 births
Brazilian footballers
Living people
Ceará Sporting Club players
Association football fullbacks
Footballers from Brasília